Volleyball at the 2005 Islamic Solidarity Games was held in Jeddah from April 9 to April 19, 2005.

Medalists

Results

Preliminary round

Group A

|}

Group B

|}

Group C

|}

Group D

|}

Second round

Group E

|}

Group F

|}

Classification
7th place match

|}5th place match

|}

Final round

|}

|}

References
Goalzz

Islamic Games
2005 Islamic Solidarity Games
2005